Neottia nidus-avis, the bird's-nest orchid, is a non-photosynthetic orchid, native to Europe, Russia, with sporadic presence in North-Africa, and some parts of the Middle East.

Description

Plants are not in any part green, deriving all their nutrition from a mycorrhizal fungus in the soil/litter, which in turn derives nutrition from the roots of trees. Plants are generally beige-brown, though sometimes yellowish or white forms are discovered. The flower labellum splits and strongly diverges at its lower end. This species of orchid can be hard to spot, being camouflaged against the leaf litter.

Across Europe, this species flowers May-June.

Distribution and habitat
It is widespread across most of Europe, occurring also in Algeria, Tunisia, western Siberia, the Caucasus, Iran and Turkey.

In the British Isles, Neottia nidus-avis is found in shady woodland, especially beech, on basic soils. Its conservation status in the UK is near-threatened.

Ecology
Neottia nidus-avis has been found to flourish only in partnership with mycorrhizal fungi in the genus Sebacina, particularly Sebacina dimitica in the UK. 

Pollination is carried out by Diptera and possibly also ants. Self-pollination may occur if insects do not pollinate the plants.

Taxonomy
The Latin binomial Neottia nidus-avis, as well as the common names of this orchid in several languages, derive from a comparison of the tangled roots of the plant to a bird's nest.

Twayblade orchids were recently reassigned to the genus Neottia after scientists found that they were closely related to N. nidus-avis.

References

External links 
 Neottia nidus-avis (L.) Rich. var. manshurica Kom.

nidus-avis
Orchids of Europe
Orchids of Asia
Flora of North Africa
Myco-heterotrophic orchids
Plants described in 1753
Taxa named by Carl Linnaeus